Pachystoma nutans, is a species of plant in the orchid family. It is endemic to Myanmar. It was first described by Sing Chi Chen and Yi Bo Luo in 2002. The type specimen of Pachystoma nutans was previously overlooked among unidentified Eulophia species at the Royal Botanic Garden herbarium in Edinburgh. It is only known from the type specimen, which was collected near Mong Yaw, Myanmar.

Description
It has 5 membranous, nerved sheaths, also glabrous. No leaves were included with the specimen, probably due to the general absence of leaves during flowering, similar to other Pachystoma and Eulophia species. The flowers are pale cream, faintly flushed with pink, with a bright yellowish-green lip. The lateral sepals are similar to the dorsal, but oblique. The lip is orbicular-ovate in outline, constricted slightly below the middle, forming three large lobes.

Pachystoma nutans is distinguished from Pachystoma pubescens by its two-flowered inflorescence (versus many-flowered); glabrous rachis (versus more or less pilose), flowers nodding (rather than horizontally spreading), and its lip trilobed slightly below the middle (rather than above the middle).

References

nutans
Endemic flora of Myanmar
Orchids of Myanmar
Plants described in 2002